Overlander or Overlanders may refer to:

An Australian name for a drover who herds large mobs of sheep or cattle over long distances, to a market or rail head, or to open up new grazing territory  
Overlander (train) was a rail service that operated between the cities of Wellington and Auckland, New Zealand
Overlander, Western Australia, a location in Australia
Overlanders, Edmonton, a residential neighbourhood in the Hermitage area of northeast Edmonton, Alberta, Canada
The Overlanders (film), a 1946 movie about Australian drovers herding cattle across the Australian outback during World War II
The Overlanders (band), the name of a British 1960s music group
Overlander Mountain, in Mount Robson Provincial Park, Canada
 Gregor the Overlander, the first book of the Underland Chronicles by Suzanne Collins
 A human-like species in the comic books Sonic the Hedgehog. They are slightly-mutated descendants of humans, having only four fingers instead of five, and were created by the Xorda gene bomb which was exploded on Earth thousands of years ago

See also
Overland (disambiguation)
Overlanding
Oberland (disambiguation)
Oberlander
Oorlams